Gunawardena is a Sinhalese surname. Notable people with the surname include:

 A. P. N. C. De S. Vaas Gunawardene (1961–1983), Sri Lankan army officer
 Amila Gunawardene (born 1980), Sri Lankan cricketer
 Arachchige Gunawardene (born 1977), Sri Lankan cricketer
 Aruna Gunawardene (born 1969), Sri Lankan cricketer
 Avishka Gunawardene (born 1977), Sri Lankan cricketer
 Bandula Gunawardane (born 1953), Sri Lankan politician
 Chathurani Gunawardene (born 1990), Sri Lankan cricketer
 Cholomondeley Goonewardene (1917–2006), Ceylonese politician
 Dayananda Gunawardena (1934–1993), Sri Lankan playwright and actor
 Deepal Gunawardene (born 1969), Sri Lankan cricketer
 Dinesh Gunawardena (born 1949), Sri Lankan politician
 Don Carlin Gunawardena (1899-1979), Ceylonese botanist and academic
 Gitanjana Gunawardena (born 1952), Sri Lankan politician
 Girley Gunawardana (1935–2012), Sri Lankan actress
 H. C. Goonewardene, Ceylonese civil servant
 Indika Gunawardena (1943-2015), Sri Lankan politician
 Jagath Gunawardana (born 1961), Sri Lankan environmentalist
 James Goonewardene (1921–1997), Sri Lankan writer
 Jeremy Gunawardena, American mathematician
 Kanchana Gunawardene (born 1984), Sri Lankan cricketer
 Kokila Gunawardena (born 1974), Sri Lankan politician
 Kusal Goonewardena, Australian physical therapist and health lecturer
 Kusumasiri Gunawardena (1912–1986), Ceylonese politician
 Leslie Goonewardene (1909–1983), Sri Lankan politician
 Leslie Gunawardana (1938–2010), Sri Lankan politician
 M. K. A. D. S. Gunawardana (1947–2016), Sri Lankan politician
 Makalandage Gunawardena, Sri Lankan air force officer
 Nalaka Gunawardene (born 1966), Sri Lankan writer
 Naveen Gunawardene (born 1998), Sri Lankan cricketer
 Otara Gunewardene, Sri Lankan businesswoman
 Philip Gunawardena (1901–1972), Ceylonese politician
 Prasanna Gunawardena, Sri Lankan politician
 Prishantha Gunawardena (born 1964), Sri Lankan archaeologist
 R. A. Gunawardana, Sri Lankan surveyor
 Ravindu Gunawardene (born 1997), Sri Lankan cricketer
 Robert Gunawardena, (1904-1971), Ceylonese politician
 Sajin Vass Gunawardena (born 1973), Sri Lankan politician
 Sarana Gunawardena (born 1964), Sri Lankan politician
 Sarath Gunawardena (born 1949), Sri Lankan politician
 Senerat Gunewardene (1899–1981), Ceylonese diplomat and politician
 Sunil Gunawardene (born 1949), Sri Lankan athlete
 Tharaka Gunawardena (born 1995), Sri Lankan cricketer
 Thelma Gunawardena (1934–2015), Sri Lankan museum director
 Trilicia Gunawardena (1934–1999), Sri Lankan actress
 Vivienne Goonewardene (1916–1996), Sri Lankan politician
 Yadamini Gunawardena, Sri Lankan politician

See also
 
 
 
 
 
 
 

Sinhalese surnames